The Epipyropidae comprise a small family of moths. This family and the closely related Cyclotornidae are unique among the Lepidoptera in that the larvae are ectoparasites, the hosts typically being fulgoroid planthoppers, thus the common name planthopper parasite moths.

Genera
Agamopsyche
Anopyrops
Epieurybrachys
Epimesophantia
Epipomponia
Epipyrops
Epiricania
Heteropsyche
Ommatissopyrops
Palaeopsyche
Protacraga

Former genera
Microlimax

See also
Tanna japonensis: a cicada host of Epipomponia nawai

References

Natural History Museum Lepidoptera Genus Database

 
Moth families
Ectoparasites
Parasites of insects
Parasitic insects